Daumantai is a village in Kėdainiai district municipality, in Kaunas County, central Lithuania. It is located by the Dotnuvėlė river and Vilnius-Šiauliai railway. According to the 2011 census, the village has a population of 80 people.  

Till the beginning of the 20 century it was okolica szlachecka. During Soviet times Daumantai was converted to the communal gardening area.

Demography

References

Villages in Kaunas County
Kėdainiai District Municipality